The North American Soccer League Best XI was given each season to the eleven players considered to have been the best in their respective positions that year for clubs in the NASL. The award was first given out in 2011, the North American Soccer League's inaugural season.

Winners

2011

2012

2013

2014

2015

2016

2017

Statistics

Performance by club

Performance by player
Multiple winners only.

External links
2011 Best XI
2012 Best XI
2013 Best XI
2014 Best XI
2015 Best XI
2016 Best XI
2017 Best XI

References

Team of the Year